The Powers That Be is a 1979 book by David Halberstam about the American media. It focuses on:

CBS
The New York Times
The Los Angeles Times
The Washington Post
Time

Critical reception
The Globe and Mail wrote: "The trouble is that the Halberstam of Vietnam, and of The Best and the Brightest, has become David Halberstam: institution, and like others who take themselves too seriously, his prose suffers."

References

External links
 

1979 non-fiction books
Alfred A. Knopf books
Books about the Watergate scandal
Books about the media
Books about journalism
Books by David Halberstam